Ted R. Smith (1906–1976) was an American aircraft designer. He worked for the Douglas Aircraft Company, Aero Design and Engineering Company, and Rockwell Standard Corporation. In 40 years, his designs included the Douglas A-26 Invader (under the direction of Ed Heinemann), and the first all metal small twin engine business aircraft for Aero Commander, a company that he helped to start. The Aero Commander line included one of the first twin engined business jets, the Jet Commander. In the 1960s, he designed and manufactured the Aerostar line, under his own name. The Aerostar was later built by Piper Aircraft, as the Piper Aerostar.

Smith was born in Oroville, California. His family later moved to Oakland, California, in 1916, where he graduated Oakland Technical High School in 1925 and soon developed his first aircraft, a tube and fabric glider. In 1929, Smith graduated from the Boeing School of Aeronautics. In 1935, Smith started his career at Douglas as a tool designer that would lead him to work on the B-18, B-23, and finally lead engineer on the A-20 project supervising 500 employees before leaving to form his own company.

References

External links
Ted R. Smith – Aerostar Designer

1906 births
1976 deaths
Aviation inventors
Businesspeople in aviation
People from Oroville, California